Glenn Kassabin Hagan (born June 25, 1955) is a retired American basketball player.  He attended Cardinal Mooney High School in Rochester, New York, and St. Bonaventure University.  After graduating from St. Bonaventure in 1978, he was an all-star guard for the Rochester Zeniths of the Continental Basketball Association in the early 1980s, leading the franchise to two CBA championships. He was a two-time All-CBA First Team selection in 1980 and 1981.

He played briefly in the NBA with the Detroit Pistons.
He now trains kids all over Rochester and other places teaching them the value of basketball and sharing his stories of game NBA life with them.

References

1955 births
Living people
American expatriate basketball people in the Philippines
American men's basketball players
Basketball players from Florida
Bay State Bombardiers players
Crispa Redmanizers players
Detroit Pistons players
Philadelphia 76ers draft picks
Philippine Basketball Association imports
Point guards
Rochester Zeniths players
Sarasota Stingers players
Sportspeople from Sanford, Florida
St. Bonaventure Bonnies men's basketball players